Scott Tracy is a fictional character in Gerry Anderson's 1960s Supermarionation television series Thunderbirds, the subsequent films Thunderbirds Are Go (1966) and Thunderbird 6 (1968) and the TV remake Thunderbirds Are Go!. He is the pilot of the primary vehicle of the Thunderbird fleet, Thunderbird 1. His specialist training is as a First Responder and Team Leader.

Original series

Character biography
The eldest son of Jeff Tracy (founder and financier of International Rescue), Scott is named after American astronaut Scott Carpenter. Sources vary in the canon of the Thunderbirds series as to Scott's age and birth date. One written source suggests that Scott was born on 4 April 2000 or 2039, making him 26 years old.

Educated at Yale and Oxford Universities, Scott was decorated for valour during his service with the United States Air Force before taking up his duties with International Rescue. As pilot of the quick response craft Thunderbird 1, he is usually first at the danger zone and typically serves as field commander on all rescue operations. He also takes on secondary duties as co-pilot of the spacecraft Thunderbird 3, is an occasional relief occupant of the Thunderbird 5 space station, and leads the organisation from Tracy Island when his father is absent.

Of the five Tracy brothers, it is Scott who keeps a cool head, and who is quick-thinking when the situation calls for it – particularly when he is at the receiving end of a gun or when the security of International Rescue is compromised. As the eldest brother, Scott nearly always assumes a leadership role during operations. Despite the secretive nature of their operation, Scott will often work with officials from rescue services, law enforcement, and other organizations who requests International Rescue’s aid.

Scott Tracy is also one of the few members of International Rescue to have killed someone. He killed the evil Zombites in their pyramid hideout in "The Uninvited" (he also probably killed Gomez and Gillespie in "Moveand You're Dead"). The others are Gordon in "Operation Crash-Dive" and Alan in Thunderbird 6.

Background
Scott's likeness was based on actor Sean Connery.

Along with Jeff and Virgil, Scott is the only other Tracy to appear in all 32 episodes of Thunderbirds, although he does not take part in the rescue operation in "The Perils of Penelope". He also does not play an active role in "Atlantic Inferno" as he was in temporary command of International Rescue.

The voice of Scott was provided by Shane Rimmer.

Live-action film
In the film, he was portrayed by actor Philip Winchester. Since the film focused on Alan Tracy, not much is known about this version of the character. According to Alex Pang's Thunderbirds: X-Ray Cross Sections, he is, like the original, the eldest Tracy brother at 24 years of age. He's also said to have "graduated from Wharton Academy [the school that Alan attends at the start of the film] with record grades", so far unmatched by his brothers, "a fact he constantly reminds them of".

Remake series
In the 2015 TV Series, Scott is portrayed by Rasmus Hardiker. Scott is still the eldest and most experienced Tracy brother and he is bold and fearless in action. He is also the team leader. However, he also possesses a very short temper, as shown whenever a member of his family is at risk because of human error.

References

American male characters in television
Fictional astronauts
Fictional United States Air Force personnel
Fictional University of Oxford people
Fictional Yale University people
Male characters in animated series
Male characters in film
Scott Carpenter
Television characters introduced in 1965
Thunderbirds (TV series) characters
Fictional people from the 20th-century
Fictional people from the 21st-century